Jean Brusselmans (1884-1953) was a Belgian painter. He developed his own style and, whereas he is often considered a representative of Flemish Expressionism, he refused to associate himself with any art movement. He was not very well known during his life, and had difficulties selling his work, but posthumously he was recognized as one of important Belgian painters of the 20th century.

Bio
Brusselmans we born on 13 June 1884 in Brussels. His parents were running a sewing workshop. He had three siblings; his younger brother Michel Brusselmans became a composer.

Exhibitions
 1942, Mannheim, Kunsthalle, Flämische Graphik der Gegenwart, Stadt with Deutsch-Vlämischen Arbeitsgemeinschaft DE.VL.AG (12/1942 - 1/1943) (cat. 21 - 23)
 2018, Gemeentemuseum, The Hague, The Netherlands.

References

1884 births
1953 deaths
Belgian Expressionist painters
20th-century Belgian painters
Artists from Brussels